Concepción Pápalo  is a town and municipality in Oaxaca in south-western Mexico. The municipality covers an area of 94.4 km2. 
It is part of Cuicatlán District in the north of the Cañada Region.

As of 2005, the municipality had a total population of 2,920.

Moth Homoeocera papalo is named after the town.

References

Municipalities of Oaxaca